Bierbaum is a German surname. Notable people with the surname include:

Otto Julius Bierbaum (1865–1910), German composer
Rosina Bierbaum (born 1952), dean of the University of Michigan School of Natural Resources and Environment
Tom and Mary Bierbaum (born 1956, 1955, respectively), married couple known for their work in Legion of Super-Heroes

See also
Bierbaum am Auersbach, municipal district in Austria

German-language surnames